Steriphopus lacertosus is a species of spider in the family Palpimanidae. The species is listed as critically endangered (possibly extinct).

References

Endemic fauna of Seychelles
Spiders of Africa
Araneomorphae
Spiders described in 1898